Donald Stafford "Red" Kellett (July 15, 1909 – November 3, 1970) was the President and General Manager of the Baltimore Colts franchise of the National Football League from 1953 until 1966. He also had a brief playing career in Major League Baseball as an infielder for the Boston Red Sox.

Early life and college
Born in Brooklyn, New York, Kellett attended Erasmus Hall High School in Brooklyn and lettered in four sports. He then attended Peekskill Military Academy in Peekskill, New York, where he lettered in three sports.

Kellet enrolled at the University of Pennsylvania where he majored in economics. In his first year, he captained the freshman football, basketball, and baseball teams. He reached varsity level for all three of the sports the next year, and received a total of nine varsity letters while at Penn. He played halfback on the football team, guard on the basketball team, and alternated between second baseman and shortstop on the baseball team.

As a senior, he was captain for the baseball team, and starting quarterback for the football team. He also was President of the Kappa Sigma fraternity, was a member of the Phi Beta Kappa Society and served on the board of governors for Houston Hall.

Baseball career
After graduating Penn, Kellett played briefly for the Boston Red Sox. He appeared in nine games during the 1934 season. He went 0-for-9 with a walk in 10 plate appearances. In the field, he made 2 errors in 15 total chances for an .867 fielding percentage playing at shortstop, second and third base. Following the season, he would be sent to the minors, and played for teams in Little Rock, Arkansas and Albany, New York. He also spent a brief amount of time with the Syracuse Chiefs before going into coaching full-time.

Coaching career
In autumn 1935, he was named head coach for the freshmen football and basketball teams at Ursinus College in Collegeville, Pennsylvania. He became head coach of the varsity football team after his brief stint with the chiefs ended.

In 1941, he left Ursinus to return to his alma mater. At Penn, he served as Director of Freshmen Athletics and head coach of the freshmen basketball and football teams. He later became head coach of the varsity basketball team, and won a conference title for the 1944–45 season.

Broadcast career
He left Penn after the 1946–47 season to become the play-by-play announcer for WFIL in Philadelphia. The first game he announced was also the first commercial football telecast for the station. Kellett went on to head operations for WFIL's radio and (now defunct) television station. During the 1948–49 season, Kellett called New York Knicks games on WOR and WPIX.

Football executive
The Baltimore Colts made Kellett team President and General Manager shortly after the team became a National Football League franchise. Kellett is credited for helping the team get Johnny Unitas, a move which made the team a household name.

In 1959, Kellett was a contender for NFL Commissioner. He was supported by four team owners who opposed the candidacy of Marshall Leahy due to his plan to move the league office to San Francisco. After eight days of deadlock, Los Angeles Rams general manager Pete Rozelle was selected as a compromise candidate.

Later life
Kellett retired to Fort Lauderdale, Florida in 1966, and died there from a heart attack at age 61. He was buried in Pikesville, Maryland.

Head coaching record

Football

References

External links
 

1909 births
1970 deaths
American men's basketball players
Guards (basketball)
Major League Baseball infielders
National Football League general managers
National Football League team presidents
Boston Red Sox players
Baltimore Colts executives
New York Knicks announcers
Penn Quakers baseball players
Penn Quakers football players
Penn Quakers men's basketball coaches
Penn Quakers men's basketball players
Ursinus Bears football coaches
Erasmus Hall High School alumni
Sportspeople from Brooklyn
Baseball players from New York City
Coaches of American football from New York (state)
Players of American football from New York (state)
Baseball players from New York (state)
Basketball coaches from New York (state)
Basketball players from New York City